Erwin N'Guema (born 18 March 1983) is a Gabonese professional footballer who currently plays as a defender.

External links 
 

1983 births
Living people
Gabonese footballers
Gabon international footballers
Association football defenders
21st-century Gabonese people
Gabon A' international footballers
2014 African Nations Championship players